is a Japanese politician, social worker and former school teacher for the disabled. He became one of the first two openly gay male politicians elected to office in Japanese history in April 2011 when he was elected to the Nakano, Tokyo ward council. The other was Taiga Ishikawa, who was elected to the Toshima ward council.

Early years 
Born in Ota-ku, Tokyo, Ishizaka grew up in Inagi City.

Education 
In March 2000, he graduated from Seikei University, as part of the Faculty of Economics, Department of Economics, International Society Course. In 2001, he completed the Department of Developmental Disorder Education, Special Course of Special Education, Chiba University . In 2002, he became a teacher at Asahi Yogo School.

In 2010, he completed the master's program at the Graduate School of Social Design, 21st Century, Rikkyo University.

Career 
In the election on April 24, 2011, he became Japan's first openly gay public officer with Taiga Ishikawa, who was first elected to the Toshima Ward Parliament on the same day. He is also the first member of the Nakano Ward to have a mental health worker qualification.

On July 6, 2017, he helped to establish the "LGBT municipality Parliamentary League." It aims to spread regulations and measures to protect the human rights of sexual minorities to local governments throughout the country through local assembly.

References

External links
 
http://ishizaka.exblog.jp/i26

Living people
1976 births
Gay politicians
Japanese LGBT politicians
Japanese LGBT rights activists
Politicians from Tokyo
Social Democratic Party (Japan) politicians